Tabernaemontana is a genus of flowering plants in the family Apocynaceae. It has a pan-tropical distribution, found in Asia, Africa, Australia, North America, South America, and a wide assortment of oceanic islands. These plants are evergreen shrubs and small trees growing to 1–15 m tall. The leaves are opposite, 3–25 cm long, with milky sap; hence it is one of the diverse plant genera commonly called "milkwood". The flowers are fragrant, white, 1–5 cm in diameter.

The cultivar T. divaricata cv. 'Plena', with doubled-petaled flowers, is a popular houseplant.

Some members of the genus Tabernaemontana are used as additives to some versions of the psychedelic drink ayahuasca; the genus is known to contain ibogaine (e.g. in bëcchëte, T. undulata), conolidine (present in minor concentration in T. divaricata) and  voacangine (T. alba, T. arborea, T. africana). Because of presence of coronaridine and voacangine in Mexican Tabernaemontana species, those plant could be used in economic production of anti-addictive alkaloids especially ibogaine and ibogamine. T. sananho preparations are used in native medicine to treat eye injuries and as an anxiolytic, and T. heterophylla is used to treat dementia in the elderly.
Conolidine may be developed as a new class of pain killer.
Caterpillars of the oleander hawk-moth (Daphnis nerii) have been found to feed on the pinwheelflower (T. divaricata).

Taxonomy

Publication
The genus was described by Carl Linnaeus and published in Species Plantarum 1: 210–211 in 1753. The type species is T. citrifolia.

Etymology
The genus name commemorates the "father of German botany" Jakob Theodor von Bergzabern, a.k.a. Jacobus Theodorus Tabernaemontanus, Tabernaemontanus being a compressed form of the original Medieval Latin name (Tabernae Montanus) of the botanist's home town of Bergzabern - both the Latin and the German forms of the town's name meaning "tavern(s) in the mountains".

Species

Gallery

See also
 Psychedelic plants
 Compounds found in Tabernaemontana
 Affinisine
 Affinine

References

  (1995): In: Ayahuasca Analogues: Pangaean Entheogens.
  (2006): Plants with possible psychoactive effects used by the Krahô Indians, Brazil. Revista Brasileira de Psiquiatria 28(4): 277–282. PDF fulltext 

 
Apocynaceae genera
Ayahuasca